The John Dirks Canada Gairdner Global Health Award is given by the Gairdner Foundation to recognize the world's top scientists who have made outstanding achievements in Global Health Research.  Since its inception, the Global Health Award has grown significantly to become one of the world's most prestigious awards recognizing excellence in global health research.

Previous winners 
2009: Nubia Muñoz
2010: Nicholas J. White
2011: Robert Edward Black
2012: Brian M. Greenwood
2013: King K. Holmes
2014: Satoshi Ōmura, 2015 Nobel Prize in Physiology or Medicine winner.
2015: Peter Piot
2016: Anthony Fauci
2017: Cesar Victora
2018: Alan Lopez, Christopher J.L. Murray
2019: Vikram Patel
2020: Salim S. Abdool Karim, Quarraisha Abdool Karim 
2021: Yi Guan, Joseph Sriyal Malik Peiris
2022: Dr. Zulfiqar Bhutta

References

See also 
 Gairdner Foundation International Award
 Gairdner Foundation Wightman Award
 Gairdner Foundation

Canadian awards